Gregory Wright Carman (January 31, 1937 – April 5, 2020) was a senior United States Judge of the United States Court of International Trade and was also a Republican member of the United States House of Representatives from New York.

Biography
Carman was born on January 31, 1937, in Farmingdale, New York. He received a Bachelor of Arts degree from St. Lawrence University in 1958 and he received a Juris Doctor from the St. John's University School of Law in 1962. Carman attended The JAG School at the University of Virginia and entered U.S. Army JAG Corps. He served in the Army JAG Corps from 1958 until 1964. He worked in private practice in Farmingdale, New York, from 1961 to 1983. He was a member of the Town Board of Oyster Bay, New York from 1972 until 1981.

Congressional service
Carman was elected to the 97th United States Congress in 1980, defeating incumbent Democrat Jerome Ambro, and represented New York's 3rd congressional district from January 3, 1981, until January 3, 1983. He was not a candidate for re-election to the 98th United States Congress

Trade Court service
On January 31, 1983, President Reagan nominated Carman to serve as a Judge of the United States Court of International Trade, to the seat vacated by Judge Scovel Richardson. His nomination was confirmed by the Senate on March 2, 1983, and he received his commission the same day. He served as Chief Judge from 1996 until 2003. He assumed senior status on September 15, 2014.

Death 
Carman died in Melville, New York on April 5, 2020.

References

References
 
 

1937 births
2020 deaths
20th-century American judges
20th-century American lawyers
21st-century American judges
Judges of the United States Court of International Trade
Military personnel from New York (state)
New York (state) lawyers
People from Farmingdale, New York
Republican Party members of the United States House of Representatives from New York (state)
St. John's University School of Law alumni
St. Lawrence University alumni
Town supervisors in New York (state)
University of Virginia School of Law alumni
The Judge Advocate General's Legal Center and School alumni
United States federal judges appointed by Ronald Reagan